King v. Trustees of Boston Univ. 420 Mass. 52  was a contracts case tried in the Massachusetts Supreme Judicial Court in 1995, involving gratuitous transfer and consideration. Coretta Scott King the administratrix of the estate of Martin Luther King Jr. submitted a motion for judgment to the trial court to recover papers that Martin Luther King Jr. submitted to Boston University, claiming that the papers were the property of the estate. The trial court ruled in favor of the defendant, the papers were deposited as a charitable contribution to Boston University. The plaintiff appealed, the trial courts decision was affirmed.

Facts
Martin Luther King Jr., an alumnus of Boston University, was asked in 1963 to deposit some papers in their library's newly expanded special collections. Around the same time multiple universities. The plaintiff testified that her husband thought "Boston seemed to be the only place, the best place, for safety," but was concerned that placing them there could subject him to criticism. King deposited some papers but sent a letter on July 16, 1964, to the university indicating that the papers would remain his legal property unless otherwise indicated. The letter contained two important statements:

King asserted that her husband made a statement of intent to act in the future, there was no consideration and jury instructions were improper. The jury found that the papers were submitted to Boston University as a charitable pledge, not a contract.

Opinion of the Court
The opinion was written by Ruth Abrams where the court affirmed the lower court's judgment that the papers were submitted to Boston University as an enforceable charitable pledge, where there was a promise to give property to a charitable institution. The letter was not a contract between the parties because there was no indication of bargained for exchange to bound Dr. King to his promise.

References 

1995 in United States case law
United States contract case law
United States district court cases
Boston University
Martin Luther King Jr.